Ángel Gallardo is a station on Line B of the Buenos Aires Underground. This is the station for Parque Centenario and the Natural History Museum.

The station is located at the intersection of Avenida Corrientes and Angel Gallardo, and named after the latter. The station was opened on 17 October 1930 as part of the inaugural section of the line between Federico Lacroze and Callao.
Its original name was Rio de Janeiro.

References

External links

Buenos Aires Underground stations
Railway stations opened in 1930
1930 establishments in Argentina